The 2014 Varsity Shield was contested from 27 January to 31 March 2014. The tournament (also known as the FNB Varsity Shield presented by Steinhoff International for sponsorship reasons) was the fourth season of the Varsity Shield, an annual second-tier inter-university rugby union competition featuring five South African universities.

Bottom side  won their relegation play-off match against challengers  to also remain in the Varsity Shield for 2015.

Rules

The Varsity Shield used a different scoring system to the regular system. Tries were worth five points as usual, but conversions were worth three points, while penalties and drop goals were only worth two points.

Competition

There were five participating universities in the 2014 Varsity Shield. These teams played each other twice over the course of the season, once at home and once away.

Teams received four points for a win and two points for a draw. Bonus points were awarded to teams that scored four or more tries in a game, as well as to teams that lost a match by seven points or less. Teams were ranked by log points, then points difference (points scored less points conceded).

The top two teams qualified for the title play-offs. These teams played each other in the final, at the home venue of the higher-placed team.

The Varsity Shield winner was promoted to the 2015 Varsity Cup competition, while the bottom team in the Varsity Cup was relegated to the 2015 Varsity Shield. There was also a promotion/relegation match between the 7th-placed team in the Varsity Cup and the Varsity Shield runner-up at the end of the 2014 season.

Teams

Standings

The final league standings for the 2014 Varsity Shield were:

Round-by-round

Fixtures

The 2014 Varsity Shield fixtures were as follows:

 All times are South African (GMT+2).

Round one

Round two

Round three

Round four

Round five

Round six

Round seven

Round eight

Round nine

Round ten

Final

Players

Player statistics

The following table contains points which have been scored in the 2014 Varsity Shield.

Squad lists

The teams released the following squad lists:

Forwards

 Gerard Baard
 Moekoa Bolofo
 Fanie Coetzer
 Daniel de Jager
 Deon Gouws
 Johann Grundlingh
 Juan Hugo
 Dean Kauprihanoff
 Hanro Liebenberg
 Vincent Maruping
 Len Noort
 Lyvette Shikwambana
 Frans Sisita
 Theuns Truter
 Danie van der Merwe
 Ian van Wyk
 Jasper Wiese
 Did not play:
 Junior Burger
 Henko de Jager
 Carl Gersbach
 Boetie Maketla
 JJ Nel
 Kevin Pretorius
 Jean-Luke van Zyl
Backs

 Heinrich Bitzi
 Stephan Griesel
 Marius Grobler
 Charlie Hitchcock
 Noël Marx
 Alec Mhlanga
 Johan Nel
 Duan Pretorius
 Kholo Ramashala
 Mosego Toolo
 Johan van Schalkwyk
 Did not play:
 Hanro Pretorius
 Stephan Schutte
 Clinton Toua
Coach

 Skillie Bester

Forwards

 Ricardo Burger
 Isak Deetlefs
 Hamish Herd
 Claude Johannes
 Adriaan Joubert
 Ewald Maré
 Juan Maritz
 Armand Marshall
 Pieter Matthews
 Mandla Mdaka
 Barend Nordeje
 David Pieterse
 Werner Serfontein
 Ryan Sim
 Gerrit van Gerwe
 Did not play:
 Jan Arnoldus Els                        
 Wayne Short
Backs

 Leroy Afrika
 Curtly Brinkhuis
 Deon Fitchet
 Brian Guillen
 Morné Hugo
 Deon Michael Joubert                    
 Ralphton Minnaar
 Edwin Oliver
 Shane Pretorius
 Gaybrin Smith
 Andries Truter
 Did not play:
 Darrio Bezuidenhout
 Shawn Jaards
 Thabo Mangena
 Thabang Mathebula
 Paul Walters
tbc

 Did not play:
 Quintis Anton Janse van Vuuren          
 Janco Muller
 Lindokuhle Sambo
 Diedrichdt Smit
Coach

 André Eloff

Forwards

 Masixole David
 Onke Dubase
 Billy Dutton
 Madoda Mbulelo Ludidi                   
 Lwando Mabenge
 Athenkosi Manentsa
 Xola Mapapu
 Ntyara Mkhafu
 Thembelihle Mpapha
 Olwethu Mputla
 Angelo Timothy Nhlapo                   
 Luzuko Nyabaza
 Siyabulela Sijula
 Sibusiso Sityebi
 Sibabalwe Tshoni
 Mzwandile Yalezo
 Did not play:
 Litha Labase
 Lubabalo Elton Lento                    
 Zuko Lerula
 Lunga Innocent Nohlwati                 
Backs

 Bangi Kobese
 Lukhanyiso Komani
 Andile Makinana
 Lithabile Mgwadleka
 Sibabalwe Mtsulwana
 Saneliso Ngoma
 Lundi Ralarala
 Mkhululi Sonqishe
 Garth van Rayner
 Oliver Zono
 Did not play:
 Lungelo Kepe
 Curtis Kleinhans
 Lwando Makhongolo
 Anda Nanto
 Lutho Zatu
tbc

 Did not play:
 Busiwe Fani                             
 Six Maselwa                             
Coach

 Elliot Fana

Forwards

 Henri Boshoff
 Deon Carney
 Marco Hillebrand
 Michael Hutton
 Gideon Koegelenberg
 Sizwe Kubheka
 Bart le Roux
 Sanele Malwane
 Dean Muir
 Leon Mulder
 Lwazi Ngcungama
 Sabelo Tshabalala
 Kabous van Schalkwyk
 Johan Wagenaar
 Mikyle Webster
 Ado Wessels
 Zwela Zondi
 Did not play:
 Marné Coetzee
 André Greyvenstein
 Matthew Mandioma
 Richard Mhlongo
 Siya Mhlongo
 Luciando Santos
Backs

 Brandon Bailing
 Alrich Brown
 Duncan Campbell
 Brendan Cope
 Spa Dube
 Henkie Groenewald
 Rico Lategan
 Nelson Makhanye
 Shayne Makombe
 Kurt Mavrodaris
 Yandisa Mdolomba
 Garath Meikle
 Philip Molnar
 Gavin Nyawata
 Cameron Wright
 Did not play:
 Ncgebo Masikane
 Mondli Ntshingila
 Ruhan Smit
 Sandile Zulu
tbc

 Did not play:
 Lindo Radebe
Coach

 John Mitchell

Forwards

 Mogamat Adams
 Tahriq Allan
 Siphiwo Bakeni
 Brandon Beukman
 Samuel Borsah
 Kelvin de Bruyn
 Matthew Faught
 Philbrey Joseph
 José Julies
 Timothy Louw
 Darren Luiters
 Pallo Manuel
 Sebenza Maphumulo
 Heinrich Marcus
 Michael Mkhize
 Njabulo Ndlovu
 Adeeb October
 Pat O'Brien
 William Scott
 Did not play:
 Curtis Beukes
 Oswin Mentoor
Backs

 Dumisani Dyonase
 Dean Herbert
 Keanu Langeveldt
 Quaid Langeveldt
 Minenhle Mthethwa
 Freddie Muller
 Matthew Nortjé
 Warrick Rhoda
 Yondela Stampu
 Dale van Schalkwyk
 James Verity-Amm
 Melik Wana
 Kenwinn Wiener
 Rufus Witbooi
 Did not play:
 Charlton Afrika
 Daniel Bock
 Lubabalo Faleni
 Justin McKay
 Cleo Voster
Coach

 Peter de Villiers

Honours

Referees

The following referees officiated matches in the 2014 Varsity Shield:

 Rodney Boneparte
 Ben Crouse
 Gerrie de Bruin
 Stephan Geldenhuys
 Quinton Immelman
 Cwengile Jadezweni
 Lusanda Jam
 Jaco Kotze
 Eduan Nel
 Francois Pretorius
 Jaco Pretorius
 Oregopotse Rametsi
 Archie Sehlako
 Lourens van der Merwe

See also

 Varsity Rugby
 2014 Varsity Rugby
 2014 Varsity Cup
 2014 SARU Community Cup
 2014 Vodacom Cup

References

External links
 
 

2014
2014 in South African rugby union
2014 rugby union tournaments for clubs